Domenico Gnoli may refer to:

 Domenico Gnoli (author) (1838–1915), Italian author
 Domenico Gnoli (painter) (1933–1970), Italian painter and stage designer